Rade Milutinović (born January 28, 1968) is a Serbian former professional basketball player.

College career 
Milutinović played college basketball for the San Diego-based U.S. International University.

Playing career 
Milutinović had two stints for Crvena zvezda of the Yugoslav League. In the 1993–94 season, he won the Yugoslav League with Zvezda and played together with Dragoljub Vidačić, Ivica Mavrenski, Saša Obradović, Mileta Lisica, Aleksandar Trifunović, and Dejan Tomašević.

In the 2000–01 season, Milutinović played for German team Mitteldeutscher. During that season his team played FIBA Korać Cup where he averaged 14.8 points, 4.0 rebounds and 3.0 assists per game over four tournaments games. He also played in Israel and Slovenia.

National team career 
Milutinović was a member of the Yugoslavia cadet national team that won the gold medal at the 1985 FIBA Europe Championship for Cadets. Over four tournament games, he averaged 4.3 points per game.

Career achievements 
 Yugoslav League champion: 1 (with Crvena zvezda: 1993–94)
 Yugoslav Super Cup winner: 1 (with Crvena zvezda: 1993)

References

External links
 Player Profile at eurobasket.com
 Player Profile at sports-reference.com

1968 births
Living people
Basketball players from Belgrade
KK Beopetrol/Atlas Beograd players
KK Borovica players
KK Crvena zvezda players
KK Sloga players
KK IMT Beograd players
Serbian men's basketball players
Serbian expatriate basketball people in Germany
Serbian expatriate basketball people in Israel
Serbian expatriate basketball people in Slovenia
Serbian expatriate basketball people in the United States
United States International Gulls men's basketball players
Yugoslav men's basketball players
Small forwards
Shooting guards